Portishead Pier to Black Nore SSSI is a 71.8 hectare geological Site of Special Scientific Interest near the town of Portishead in North Somerset, notified in 1952.

The Portishead Pier Section is made up of alluvial sandstones which represents the best exposure of Upper Carboniferous rocks in the Avonmouth Coalfield. The cliff and foreshore exposures around Portishead Point provide important exposures of geological  structures form during the Variscan mountain building episode (orogeny) in the Carboniferous Period of geological history. Also included are areas which show important exposures of the Devonian sequence and yields several species of fossil fishes. Holoptychius scales are the most abundant fossils, but teeth scales of other species are also relatively common. Notably amongst the collection from this bed are plates of arthrodires, including Groenlandaspis.

References

Sites of Special Scientific Interest in North Somerset
Sites of Special Scientific Interest notified in 1952
Portishead, Somerset